Aloni is a surname. Notable people with the surname include:

Izak Aloni (Schächter) (1905–85), Israeli chess master
Maria Aloni (born 1969), Italian philosopher
Michael Aloni (born 1984), Israeli actor
Miri Aloni (born 1949), Israeli folk singer
Nisim Aloni (1926–1998), Israeli playwright and translator
Shulamit Aloni (1928–2014), Israeli politician and left-wing activist
Udi Aloni (born 1959), Israeli-American filmmaker, writer and visual artist
Yoel Aloni (1937–2019), Israeli chess master and problemist

See also
Balter, Guth, Aloni & Co. (founded in 1974), Israeli law firm